The Tower Hotel is a large hotel situated on the north bank of the River Thames, on the east side of Tower Bridge, in London.

The hotel was designed by the Renton Howard Wood Partnership, constructed by Taylor Woodrow for owners J. Lyons & Co., and opened in September 1973 by the Constable of the Tower of London, Sir Richard Hull. It was built in a Brutalist style and was voted the second most hated building in London in a 2006 BBC poll.

J. Lyons operated the hotel until July 1977 when it was sold for £6.5m to EMI Leisure. In 1980, EMI Leisure properties, including the Tower Hotel, were sold to Trusthouse Forte. The hotel was later acquired by the Thistle Hotels group.

The hotel has 801 rooms, as well as 19 meeting rooms with capacity for up to 600 people. It also has a gym, restaurant, coffee bar, and licensed premises. The hotel is ultimately owned by Singapore-based GuocoLeisure which shifted the hotel into a separate luxury brand called Guoman Hotels, now GLH Hotels.

It is frequently used for roof top filming due to its high level view of a skyline including Tower Bridge, Tower of London and the river. 

The nearest London Underground station is Tower Hill. Tower Gateway DLR station is also nearby.

See also
 Hotels in London
 Silver Jubilee Crystal Crown, mounted on the wall of the Tower Hotel

References

Hotels in London